Ultravisitor is the seventh album by English electronic musician Squarepusher, released on 8 March 2004 by Warp Records. The album incorporates many of the various musical styles exhibited by Jenkinson on his previous albums, including drum and bass, acid techno, jazz fusion, and electronic noise. A few of the tracks feature layered, modulated, or filtered bass guitar. Several of the instrumental parts were recorded live and include applause, blurring the lines between live and studio performances.

Tom Jenkinson has stated that "Ultravisitor is my spectacle of beauty and of terror. It is unknowable, and will never be understood by anybody, least of all its creator."

Track listing
All tracks by Tom Jenkinson, all instruments played by Tom Jenkinson.

The album was released in three formats. The first is a standard CD release, presented in a standard jewel case with Tom Jenkinson featured on the cover. Second, there is a limited edition of the CD, presented in a book-style case, with bonus artwork and notes by Jenkinson. Third, a double LP vinyl version of this album was released. Orders from the Warp's online store Warpmart included a 3" mini CD, entitled Square Window, with outtakes and B-sides from the album.

A promotional CD and record for Ultravisitor featured "Square Window", a new track entitled "Talk About You & Me", and the title track, "Ultravisitor" in a studio version, whereas the "album" version was a live recording.

"Venus No. 17" was also released as a vinyl-only single, featuring the title track, an Acid remix of it, and a reworking of the Feed Me Weird Things track "Tundra", entitled "Tundra 4".

Jenkinson has stated that the track "50 Cycles" took over a month to complete.

References

External links
Ultravisitor at the official Warp Records website

Tom Jenkinson interview from i-D, at the Warp Records site.

Squarepusher albums
2004 albums
Warp (record label) albums